This is the discography for American rock band O.A.R.

Studio albums

Live albums

Live extended plays

Compilation albums

Singles

Song appearances 

O.A.R. performed the theme song for the ABC show Extreme Makeover: Home Edition. During a two-hour special that aired on December 11, 2005, they provided a street-side concert, including a live performance of "So Much", the Extreme Makeover Home Edition theme, in front of the newly redesigned Los Angeles Free Clinic.
In 2006, O.A.R. Performed at the MLB's Home Run Derby at PNC Park in Pittsburgh, Singing "Love and Memories" and other titles.
In 2006, the band's song "Love and Memories" was featured in the movie She's the Man.
In June 2007 the band's songs "Wonderful Day" and "One Shot" were used extensively by ESPN during its coverage of the 2007 NCAA Division I baseball tournament and College World Series; "This Town" was similarly used in 2008
In 2008, their song "Love is Worth The Fall" was featured on the deluxe edition soundtrack for the film Twilight. The song was also released as an iTunes single.
On Oct. 16 2011, the songs "Heaven" and "Wonderful Day" were played during "iGenius," a documentary about the life and death of Steve Jobs which was hosted by Adam Savage and Jamie Hyneman of MythBusters.
 On March 28, 2015, the WWE used the song "Peace" as part of a tribute to fan Connor "The Crusher". 
 ESPN has used "That Was a Crazy Game of Poker" as an introduction to its coverage of the World Series of Poker.

Album appearances 

Compilation name (year, song title)
Bonnaroo 2003 (2003, "Risen")
National Heads-Up Poker Championship 2005 (1997, "That Was a Crazy Game of Poker")
Rock For Relief (2006, "James")
Mixclusives: Volume 6 (2006, "Love & Memories")
The Target Red Room Volume: 5 (2006, "One Shot (live)")
Kyle XY Soundtrack (2007, "Wonderful Day")
Instant Karma: The Amnesty International Campaign to Save Darfur (2007, "Borrowed Time")
For the Kids Three (2007, "Itsy Bitsy Spider")
Serve2: Fighting Hunger & Poverty (2007, "Dareh Meyod" [*version from Live from Madison Square Garden])
Serve4: Artists Against Hunger & Poverty  (2009, "Lay Down" [*version from Rain or Shine)
Twilight (soundtrack) (Special/Deluxe Edition) (2009, "Love Is Worth The Fall")
Music For Action: Best of Bonnaroo (2010, "Delicate Few" [*version from Bonnaroo 2005])

Notes

References 

Discographies of American artists
Rock music group discographies